Empress Sima (司馬皇后) may refer to:

Sima Maoying (393–439), empress of the Jin dynasty
Sima Lingji ( 579–581), empress of the Northern Zhou dynasty

Sima